Ternavka may refer to the following places in Ukraine:

Ternavka, Chernivtsi Oblast, village in Hertsa Raion, Chernivtsi Oblast
Ternavka, Iziaslav Raion, village in Iziaslav Raion, Khmelnytskyi Oblast
Ternavka, Kamianets-Podilskyi Raion, village in Kamianets-Podilskyi Raion, Khmelnytskyi Oblast
Ternavka, Skole Raion, village in Skole Raion, Lviv Oblast
Ternavka, Zhydachiv Raion, village in Zhydachiv Raion, Lviv Oblast